A list of current heads of colleges at the University of Cambridge, England.

References

 
heads of University of Cambridge colleges